CBS Outdoor may refer to:

CBS Outdoor Americas which has now been rebranded as Outfront Media
CBS Outdoor International which has now been rebranded as Exterion Media